The Weddel loop is a 21.1 km long German railway between Fallersleben (part of Wolfsburg) and Weddel (in the municipality of Cremlingen near Brunswick). It is single-track and electrified and forms part of route number 301 (Brunswick–Wolfsburg–Stendal). It connects the Hanover–Berlin high-speed line with the Hanover–Würzburg high-speed line for Intercity-Express trains running between Frankfurt and Berlin.

Route 
The route branches off the Brunswick–Magdeburg line (No. 1900, KBS 310) east of Weddel station 6.6 km east of Brunswick Hauptbahnhof (near the line's 10 km chainage point) and runs as a single track to Lehre station. This station has no passenger facilities, but has two tracks, which provide the only possibility for trains to overtake or cross on the route. It continues as a single track to Sülfeld junction where it again forms two tracks. One of them crosses a bridge over the high-speed  line (at its 187.5 km mark) and then connects with the northern track of the high-speed  line (running towards Hanover). The other track runs directly onto the southern track (running towards Wolfsburg and Berlin).

The Weddel loop has been prepared for the installation of a second track. Provision has also been made for a raising of speed limits to 200 km/h. Between the 22.4 and 24.2 km marks the line is equipped with the German automatic train protection system, Linienzugbeeinflussung.

Significance of route 
The line links Brunswick and Hildesheim with the Hanover–Berlin high speed line which was built at the same time. At Hildesheim long distance trains connect with the Hanover-Würzburg high speed line via the Hildesheim loop.

Each hour, approximately every one pair of ICE trains (Berlin–Frankfurt am Main–Mannheim) and a pair Regionalbahn trains run on the line. Between the junctions at each end of the track the line has a speed limit of 160 km/h.
Along with the single-track Hildesheim loop and the single-track Hildesheim–Groß Gleidingen line, the Weddel loop is one of the bottlenecks between Frankfurt and Berlin. In particular, the level junction in Weddel has proved to cause delays.

Planning and construction

History prior to 1989 
Between 1901 and 1904 the Schunter Valley Railway was built as the first rail link between Fallersleben and Brunswick. It was a branch line of the Brunswick State Railway Company that left Fallersleben towards the east, running east of the current line before crossing it north of Lehre, then running along the Schunter river to Brunswick-Gliesmarode (then not connected to the Brunswick–Uelzen railway) and terminating at the then North Station (German: Nordbahnhof) of the Brunswick State Railway. This line was nationalised in 1938 and a new connection was built at its western end to connect with Gliesmarode station. At the eastern end of the line a two-track main line was planned from Fallersleben, where the Volkswagen works is now connected with the Lehrte Railway, to the planned new Brunswick central station (about where the current station was opened in 1960) and on to the newly built steel mill in Salzgitter. The route would leave Fallersleben to the west and run directly south. Of the planned works only the single track section north of Lehre had been completed by 1942 and this was attached temporarily to the existing branch line; construction work then stopped because of World War II and the old line was closed between Lehre and Fallersleben. This temporary connection remained for over fifty years, although the branch line was used by up to 20 freight trains a day.

Planning from 1990 to construction in 1996-1998 
In accordance with the decision taken in July 1990 to construct the Hanover–Berlin high-speed line on the northern route (via Wolfsburg) instead of the alternative southern route (through Magdeburg and Potsdam), the establishment of a connection through the stations of Wolfsburg and Brunswick was necessary. Although a direct connection was considered between Oebisfelde and Brunswick, this idea was dropped in the face of strong opposition from the city of Wolfsburg.

After long discussions over the financing of a new line it was decided to reduce the project from double track to single track at an estimated cost of Deutsche Mark 300–350 million, saving DM 50 to 100 million. In November 1996, the Federal Ministry of Transport agreed to release DM 242 million for the project and after the finalisation of planning approvals large-scale construction began in 1997. Although it was originally planned to open the new line in early 1999. in May 1998 Deutsche Bahn decided to complete it at the same time as the Hanover–Berlin high-speed line, because DB considered that Hanover station would not cope with all Intercity-Express being routed that way, which would require a reversal. This required work 24 hours a day, seven days a week. The new line was opened on 20 September 1998.

Notes

References

 (old route)

Railway lines in Lower Saxony
Transport in Braunschweig
Railway lines opened in 1998
1998 establishments in Germany
Buildings and structures in Braunschweig
Buildings and structures in Wolfsburg
Buildings and structures in Wolfenbüttel (district)
Buildings and structures in Helmstedt (district)